Auburn is a city in DeKalb County, Indiana, United States. The population was 13,820 at the 2020 census. Founded in 1836 by Wesley Park (1811–1868), the city is the county seat of DeKalb County. Auburn is also known as Home of the Classics.

History
Auburn's site on Cedar Creek was chosen by Wesley Park and John Badlam Howe at the intersection of two major trails, Goshen-Defiance Road and Coldwater Road, and next to the land of John Houlton.  The name for the community likely came from "The Deserted Village" by Oliver Goldsmith, that begins "Sweet Auburn! Loveliest village of the plain."   The plat of the Village of Auburn is dated April 21, 1836, but it was held by Howe and not recorded until March 12, 1879.  John Drury purchased the first lot (Lot 73) for $25.00 on September 5, 1837.  The first store was built at Park's corners by Thomas Freeman, applying for a license on March 5, 1838, and bringing supplies by horseback from Fort Wayne.  Daniel Altenburg, Levi Walsworth, the Sherlock family, Samuel Sprott, David Weave, David Shoemaker, Henry Curtis, Lyman Childsey, James Cosper, and David Cosper were early residents.

A post office was established in 1839.  In 1841, malaria ran through the town, and in 1843 a terrible storm wreaked havoc on cabins and crops.  The Church of God was built by the Presbyterians in 1846.  The Village of Auburn was incorporated in 1849, divided into wards, and governed under a town board and constable.  By the end of the American Civil War, the town included over 700 inhabitants.  The storm of September 29, 1872, destroyed Odd Fellow's Hall and damaged the Methodist Episcopal church.  A few months later (April 6, 1873), the new brick block of Seventh Street (Snyder's Building) collapsed, also destroying the Ensley Building.  Auburn water and lights was constructed in 1898.  The change in status to the City of Auburn on March 26, 1900, followed a referendum.  Notable citizen Charles Eckhart erected a public library and a YMCA building.

The Auburn Automobile Company founded in 1900 produced its first automobile in 1903.  William Wrigley, Jr. and Errett Lobban Cord controlled interests in the company that eventually acquired Duesenberg, Lexington, and Lycoming Engines, and started Cord Car Company.  The company failed in August 1937.  Other makes of cars built in Auburn include Black, de soto (Not De Soto by Chrysler), IMP, Kiblinger, McIntyre and Zimmerman.

The Auburn Rubber Company was started in 1913 as the Double Fabric Tire Company, making tires for Auburn Automobile Company.  In the 1920s as Auburn Rubber, it became a large manufacturer of rubber toys, leaving Auburn in 1959.

Bank robber John Dillinger and some accomplices raided Auburn's police station on October 14, 1933, stealing a submachine gun, two steel vests, three rifles, six pistols and over 1000 rounds of ammunition.

The acts that led to the U.S. Supreme Court's decision in Stump v. Sparkman, 435 U.S. 349 (1978), the leading American case on judicial immunity, took place in Auburn in 1971. On June 28, 1988, four workers were asphyxiated at a local metal-plating plant in the worst confined-space industrial accident in U.S. history; a fifth victim died two days later.

The Auburn Community Mausoleum, Auburn Cord Duesenberg Automobile Museum, Downtown Auburn Historic District, and Eckhart Public Library and Park are listed on the National Register of Historic Places.

Auburn was home to early automobile company DeSoto in 1913.  This company has no connection with the DeSoto that was manufactured by Chrysler.

Geography

Most of Auburn is located in Union civil township. Portions of Jackson and Keyser civil townships are also within the city limits.

Climate
Auburn has typical continental weather with very warm summers and very cold winters.

Demographics

2010 census
As of the 2010 census, there were 12,731 people, 5,226 households, and 3,322 families living in the city. The racial makeup of the city was 96.9% White, 0.4% African American, 0.2% Native American, 0.7% Asian, 0.7% from other races, and 1.0% from two or more races. Hispanic or Latino of any race were 2.6% of the population.

There were 5,226 households, of which 32.5% had children under the age of 18 living with them, 46.0% were married couples living together, 12.3% had a female householder with no husband present, 5.2% had a male householder with no wife present, and 36.4% were non-families. 31.2% of all households were made up of individuals, and 13.9% had someone living alone who was 65 years of age or older. The average household size was 2.38 and the average family size was 2.96.

The median age in the city was 37.9 years. 25.3% of residents were under the age of 18; 8.1% were between the ages of 18 and 24; 25.9% were from 25 to 44; 25.1% were from 45 to 64; and 15.6% were 65 years of age or older. The gender makeup of the city was 48.1% male and 51.9% female.

2000 census
As of the 2000 census, there were 12,074 people, 4,927 households, and 3,202 families living in the city. The racial makeup of the city was 97.71% White, 0.35% African American, 0.10% Native American, 0.41% Asian, 0.02% Pacific Islander, 0.61% from other races, and 0.80% from two or more races. Hispanic or Latino of any race were 1.75% of the population.

There were 4,927 households, out of which 33.4% had children under the age of 18 living with them, 51.2% were married couples living together, 10.1% had a female householder with no husband present, and 35.0% were non-families. 30.1% of all households were made up of individuals, and 12.2% had someone living alone who was 65 years of age or older. The average household size was 2.41 and the average family size was 2.99.

In the city the population was spread out, with 26.4% under the age of 18, 9.2% from 18 to 24, 30.7% from 25 to 44, 19.9% from 45 to 64, and 13.7% who were 65 years of age or older. The median age was 34 years. For every 100 females, there were 92.5 males. For every 100 females age 18 and over, there were 89.0 males.

The median income for a household in the city was $42,762, and the median income for a family was $52,687. Males had a median income of $38,007 versus $24,414 for females. The per capita income for the city was $20,945. About 2.9% of families and 5.2% of the population were below the poverty line, including 3.4% of those under age 18 and 7.5% of those age 65 or over.

Arts and culture

The Dekalb County Free Fall Fair is held in downtown Auburn. It starts at the end of September and has over 850,000 guests a year.

Auburn is the location of the Auburn Cord Duesenberg Festival, held each Labor Day weekend, and of the Auburn Cord Duesenberg Automobile Museum and the National Automotive and Truck Museum of the United States. Both are National Historic Landmarks. The Auburn Cord Duesenberg Festival, with the annual Labor Day auction, is said to host one of the world's largest automotive auctions.  These automotive-related events are the legacy of the Auburn Automobile Company, which closed in the late 1930s. The company had its headquarters and a factory in Auburn. Other museums located near Auburn include the Hoosier Air Museum, the Kruse Automotive and Carriage Museum, which includes the International Monster Truck Hall of Fame, and the World War II Victory Museum. Auburn also hosts the annual DeKalb County Free Fall Fair, a six-day event usually held in the last week of September.

The official city logo, pictured at right, is based on the logo of the former Auburn Automobile Company. The company went out of business in the 1930s. The municipality began using the logo in the 1980s. The city's official nickname is '"Home of the Classics,"' a reference to the "classic" automobiles once manufactured there.

Government

Auburn is governed by an elected mayor and seven-member common council and a three-member board of public works and safety consisting of the mayor and two others appointed by the mayor. Five members of the common council are elected from individual districts and two are elected at-large.

Education
Most of Auburn lies in the DeKalb County Central United School District. Public schools serving Auburn are:
 James R. Watson Elementary School
  McKenney-Harrison Elementary School
 DeKalb Middle School (Waterloo)
 DeKalb High School (Waterloo)

There is also a K-12 private school:
 Lakewood Park Christian School

The town has a free lending library, the Eckhart Public Library.

Media

Radio stations
 106.7 WFGA - Classic Country
 1570 AM WGLL — religious
 102.3 FM WGBJ — "Mega 102.3" Licensed to Auburn, studios in Fort Wayne, Indiana

Newspaper
 The Star, (formerly known as The Evening Star)

Notable people
 Gordon Buehrig (1904–1990), automobile designer, lived in Auburn for two years while designing 1935–1936 Auburn Speedster and is buried in Roselawn Cemetery.
 Errett Lobban Cord (1894–1974), industrialist, lived in Auburn while running Auburn Automobile Company.
 Will Cuppy (1884–1949), humorist and journalist, was born in Auburn, graduated from Auburn High School and is buried in Evergreen Cemetery.
 James I. Farley (1871–1948), member of US House of Representatives, 1933–1939, lived in Auburn while executive of Auburn Automobile Company and is buried in Woodlawn Cemetery.
 Walter Hartman Hodge (1896–1975) was a lawyer and judge.
 MaChelle Joseph, former women's basketball head coach at Georgia Tech, player for Purdue, 1992 Big Ten Player of the Year; born in Auburn.
 Don Lash (1912–1994), track-and-field champion, won 1938 James E. Sullivan Award as top amateur athlete in U.S., graduated from Auburn High School in 1933.
 Charles A.O. McClellan (1835–1898), member of US House of Representatives, 1889–1892, lived in Auburn and practiced law there.
 Rollie Zeider (1883-1967), early 20th Century Major League Baseball player, was born in Cass County and raised in Auburn.

Port Authority
Auburn controls, maintains, and owns the City of Auburn Port Authority. It consists of one mile of track servicing two industries on the former Fort Wayne and Jackson Railroad. The Port Authority owns no locomotives or rolling stock and the only employees are the five-member volunteer board of directors. CSX delivers about twenty five cars of plastic resin a year.

References

External links

 
Cities in Indiana
Cities in DeKalb County, Indiana
1836 establishments in Indiana
Populated places established in 1836